Ron Fuller may refer to:

Ron Fuller (artist) (1937–2017), British artist and toy designer
Ron Fuller (wrestler) (born c.1950), American wrestler